Contextualization may refer to:

 Contextualization (Bible translation), the process of contextualising the biblical message as perceived in the missionary mandate originated by Jesus
 Contextualization (computer science), an initialization phase setting or overriding properties having unknown or default values at the time of template creation
 Contextualization (sociolinguistics), the use of language and discourse to signal relevant aspects of an interactional or communicative situation
 Contextualism, a collection of views in philosophy which argue that actions or expressions can only be understood in context

See also 
 Context (disambiguation)